The Senegal national rugby union team represent Senegal in the sport of rugby union. They are ranked as a tier-three nation by the International Rugby Board (IRB). Senegal have thus far not qualified for a Rugby World Cup, but have competed in qualifying tournaments. They also contest the annual Africa Cup.

History
Early internationals were played by Senegal against Côte d'Ivoire. Senegal played a number of internationals in 2003 and 2004. 

In 2005, Senegal played in qualifying tournaments for the 2007 Rugby World Cup in France. They finished first in the final standings of their pool, after defeating Cameroon and Nigeria. Senegal advanced to the play-off, defeating Zambia to advance to Round 1b. However they finished third in their pool in Round 1b after losing to Côte d'Ivoire and Zimbabwe. 

Senegal also played in the 2006 Africa Cup. Senegal also missed the 2011 Rugby World Cup and the 2015 World Cup.

Tournament history

Africa Cup

Current squad

World Cup record

See also
 Rugby union in Senegal

External links
 Senegal on rugbydata.com

African national rugby union teams
Rugby union in Senegal
National sports teams of Senegal